Polyus may refer to:

Polyus (spacecraft), a Soviet spacecraft launched in 1987 that failed to reach orbit
Polyus (company), a Russian gold producer